The Château de Cornod is a Gothic Revival château in Cornod, Jura, Franche-Comté, France.

History
It was built in 1876 to the design of architects Henri Despierre and Henri Feuga.

Architectural significance
It has been listed as an official historical monument by the French Ministry of Culture since 1971.

References

Châteaux in Jura (department)
Monuments historiques of Bourgogne-Franche-Comté
Houses completed in 1876